An online integrated development environment, also known as a web IDE or cloud IDE, is a browser based integrated development environment. An online IDE can be accessed from a web browser, such as Firefox, Google Chrome or Microsoft Edge, enabling software development on low-powered devices that are normally unsuitable. An online IDE does not usually contain all of the same features as a traditional desktop IDE, only basic IDE features such as a source-code editor with syntax highlighting. Integrated version control and Read–Eval–Print Loop (REPL) may also be included.

Online IDE's can be further categorized into professional and educational.

Examples

 Cloud9 IDE
 Codeanywhere
 CodeSandbox
 Codiva
 Dockside
 Eclipse Che IDE
 Gitpod
 Glitch
 goormIDE
 JSFiddle
 PaizaCloud Cloud IDE
 Replit
 SourceLair
 StackBlitz
 OneCompiler

References

Integrated development environments